Mehmet Ali Yatağan (born 30 April 1993) is a Turkish professional basketball player who last played for Bursaspor of the Turkish Basketball First League.

References

External links
 TBLStat.net Profile

1993 births
Living people
Beşiktaş men's basketball players
Shooting guards
Basketball players from Istanbul
Turkish men's basketball players